The 1889 Melbourne Cup was a two-mile handicap horse race which took place on Tuesday, 5 November 1889.

This year was the 29th running of the Melbourne Cup. The race is best known for 1890 winner Carbine finishing second. Bravo was sired by 1880 Melbourne Cup winner Grand Flaneur.

This is the list of placegetters for the 1889 Melbourne Cup.

See also

 Melbourne Cup
 List of Melbourne Cup winners
 Victoria Racing Club

References

1889
Melbourne Cup
Melbourne Cup
19th century in Melbourne
1880s in Melbourne